The 2004–05 Elitserien was the 71st season of the top division of Swedish handball. 14 teams competed in the league. The eight highest placed teams qualified for the playoffs, whereas teams 11–12 had to play relegation playoffs against teams from the second division, and teams 13–14 were relegated automatically. IFK Skövde won the regular season, but IK Sävehof won the playoffs and claimed their second Swedish title.

League table

Playoffs bracket

References 

Swedish handball competitions